Willy Zeyn (1876-1946) was a German film director and screenwriter of the silent era.  His son Willy Zeyn became a film editor and producer.

Selected filmography
 The Gambler (1919)
 The Hound of the Baskervilles (1920) aka Der Hund von Baskerville
 The Dance of Love and Happiness (1921)
 The New Paradise (1921)
 The Passenger in Compartment Seven (1922)

References

Bibliography
 Thomas Elsaesser & Michael Wedel. A Second Life: German Cinema's First Decades.

External links

1876 births
1946 deaths
Film people from Hamburg
Silent film screenwriters
20th-century screenwriters